Alsta (historically, Alsten or Alstein) is an island in the municipalities of Alstahaug and Leirfjord in Nordland county, Norway. The island is surrounded by the Vefsnfjorden to the east, the Leirfjorden to the north, and the Alstenfjorden to the south and west.

In 2017, there were 6,969 residents on the island. The islands of Altra and Skålvær lie to the southwest, the islands of Tjøtta, Offersøya, Mindlandet, and Rødøya lie to the south, surrounding the entrance to the Vefsnfjorden.

The island is connected to the mainland by the Helgeland Bridge on Norwegian County Road 17, which connects the northern part of the island to the municipality of Leirfjord on the mainland.  This same highway 17 continues across the island from north to south where it then connects by bridge to the nearby islands of Offersøya and Tjøtta.  

The eastern part of the island is often called the "backside" of the island since it is on the other side of the mountains from the more populous side.  This "backside" lies inside the municipality of Leirfjord and the Sundøy Bridge connects the Sundøy village area on the backside of the island to the mainland.

See also
List of islands of Norway

References

Alstahaug
Leirfjord
Islands of Nordland